Asterolasia rivularis is a small, upright shrub, with narrow leaves and yellow flowers. It has a restricted distribution in New South Wales.

Description 
The leaf upper surface has occasional star-shaped hairs, underside brownish star-shaped to short matted hairs, margins slightly rolled under and narrowing to a short petiole. Flowering occurs in early spring.

Taxonomy
The species was first formally described by Paul G. Wilson in 1998 and the description was published in the journal Nuytsia.

Distribution and habitat
Asterolasia rivularis  has a restricted distribution, it is  found growing along streams near Buxton.

References

rivularis
Flora of New South Wales
Sapindales of Australia
Taxa named by Paul G. Wilson